The traditional Chinese calendar divides a year into 24 solar terms. Lìdōng, Rittō, Ipdong, or Lập đông is the 19th solar term. It begins when the Sun reaches the celestial longitude of 225° and ends when it reaches the longitude of 240°. It more often refers in particular to the day when the Sun is exactly at the celestial longitude of 225°. In the Gregorian calendar, it usually begins around November 7 and ends around November 22.

Lidong signifies the beginning of winter in East Asian cultures.

Pentads

水始冰, 'Water begins to freeze' – the initial stages of water bodies freezing over.
地始凍, 'The earth begins to harden'
雉入大水為蜃, 'Pheasants enter the water for clams'

Date and time

19
Winter time